A list of windmills in the Dutch province of Limburg.

 
Limburg